Hurra, die Schule brennt! (German: "Hurrah, the School Is Burning!") is a 1969 German comedy film directed by Werner Jacobs and starring Peter Alexander, Heintje Simons and Theo Lingen. It is the fourth of a series of school comedy films under the collective title  ("The Brats from the Front Bench Row"), all of them starring Hansi Kraus and Theo Lingen.

Plot
Dr. Peter Bach (Peter Alexander), a young and excellent teacher, has been mistakenly diverted to the village of Tuttelbach, where he teaches at the local elementary school. When the head of the Education Ministry, von Schnorr, attempts to correct that mistake, he finds Dr. Bach unwilling to leave since he has come to enjoy the easy and picturesque village life. However, in the end Bach is left with no other choice when von Schnorr accidentally drops his burning cigar into the school room's waste basket, where it quickly starts a fire that burns the school to the ground.

Dr. Bach and his nephew Jan (Heintje Simons) move to Baden-Baden, where Bach is assigned to the notorious Class 12a of the Mommsen-Gymnasium. Pepe Nietnagel (Hansi Kraus) and his classmates initially meet their new teacher with little enthusiasm, but Bach's easy-going and frank personality soon gains their genuine sympathy and support. Oberstudiendirektor Dr. Taft (Theo Lingen), as the old-fashioned traditionalist he is, however, just as quickly disapproves of Bach's approach to the students, and together with the teaching staff's majority (not including young music teacher Julia Schumann, played by Gerlinde Locker) decide to get rid of him as quickly as possible. When Pepe and his friends learn about this, they begin to fight tooth and nail to keep Bach at their school, culminating in a school play in which Bach and the students present a very liberal re-interpretation of Schiller's William Tell. The film ends with Kurt Nietnagel, Pepe's father, asking Dr. Taft to attend the christening and maiden flight of a new glider at Nietnagel's glider club, which ends with Taft and Bach accidentally making the flight and a subsequent parachute dive to get back to Earth.

Cast
 Hansi Kraus as Pepe Nietnagel
 Peter Alexander as Dr. Peter Bach 
 Heintje Simons as Jan 
 Theo Lingen as Oberstudiendirektor Dr. Taft 
 Gerlinde Locker as Julia Schumann 
 Werner Finck as von Schnorr 
 Rudolf Schündler as Studienrat Dr. Knörz 
 Ruth Stephan as Studienrätin Dr. Pollhagen 
 Alexander Golling as Blaumeier 
 Hans Terofal as Pedell Bloch 
 Harald Juhnke as Referent
 Wolfgang Gruner as Kurt Nietnagel 
 Carola Höhn as Frau Nietnagel

Songs
 "" ("Hooray, the School Is Burning") ... Peter Alexander and children's choir
 "" ("The Two of Us Get Along Well") ... Peter Alexander and Heintje
 "" ("When Bohemia was still part of Austria") ... Peter Alexander
 "" ("Being Young is Nice") ... Heintje
 "Wilhelm Tell-Song" ... Peter Alexander and choir
 "" ("Again and Again") ... Peter Alexander and Heintje
 "" ("Love Dreams") ... Peter Alexander
 "Bonanza" ... Peter Alexander
 "" ("Follow Your Way") ... Heintje

Awards
1970: Goldene Leinwand

References

External links

1969 films
1969 musical comedy films
Films about educators
Films directed by Werner Jacobs
German musical comedy films
1960s German-language films
West German films
1960s German films